Ottawa Centre is an urban provincial electoral district in Ontario, Canada that has been represented in the Legislative Assembly of Ontario since 1968. While the riding's boundaries (mainly to the south and west as the north and east borders have remained the Ottawa River and Rideau Canal, respectively) have changed over the years to account for population changes, the riding has always comprised the central areas of Ottawa, the nation's capital.

History

The district was created before the 1967 election. Since the 1999 election, the provincial district has had the same borders as the federal riding of Ottawa Centre.

It is represented in the Legislative Assembly of Ontario by Joel Harden of the Ontario NDP. The provincial riding has been won by the NDP nine times (1971, 1975, 1977, 1981, 1984 by-election, 1985, 1990, 2018 and 2022) and by the Liberals eight times (1967, 1987, 1995, 1999, 2003, 2007, 2011 and 2014) and never by the Conservatives or any other party.

Geography
The riding covers most of downtown Ottawa, including the Parliament Buildings.  From the historic Rideau Canal, the riding stretches west encompassing the neighbourhoods of Downtown, Centretown (Centretown West which includes Little Italy is usually considered a distinct neighbourhood), Lebreton Flats, Mechanicsville, Hintonburg and Westboro. The riding encompasses additional neighbourhoods south of downtown, including The Glebe, Old Ottawa South, Lees Avenue, Old Ottawa East and others.

Party support varies between different parts of the riding. The consistently best areas for the Ontario New Democratic Party (NDP) are Old Ottawa South, the Glebe, and Centretown. Old Ottawa South and the Glebe are also the main Green party areas. The suburban far south and west of the riding around Hog's Back and Carlingwood Park, the large homes near the Civic Hospital, the expensive homes and apartments by the Rideau Canal, and the more expensive downtown condos are the most strongly Liberal and Conservative areas. The major swing areas are the western portions of the riding such as Hintonburg and Westboro:  while traditionally Liberal, these neighbourhoods have recently become stronger for the NDP.

Many public sector workers live in the riding. The northern part of the riding contains many government office buildings, including Parliament Hill.  The riding also includes Carleton University and Saint Paul University's campuses and residences.

Members of Provincial Parliament

Election results

2007 electoral reform referendum

Constituency associations
 Ottawa Centre Provincial Liberal Association
 Ottawa Centre Riding Association - Ontario PC Party
 The Green Party in Ottawa Centre
 Ottawa Centre NDP Riding Association

Sources

External links
Map of riding for 2018 election

Provincial electoral districts of Ottawa